Menik may refer to:
Měník, Czechia
Mënik, Albanian
Ménik language
Menik Kurukulasuriya (born 1957), Sri Lankan actress